Trachycorystes trachycorystes, the black catfish, is a species of driftwood catfish found in Brazil, Guyana and Venezuela.  It is also sold in the aquarium trade.  It grows to a length of 35 cm.

References 
 

Auchenipteridae
Fish described in 1840
Fish of South America
Fish of Brazil